Muskegon High School is a public high school located in Muskegon, Michigan, and was the first high school in Muskegon County, Michigan.

History
The Class of 1875, consisting of two girls, was the first from Muskegon High School.  Records show there were 102 students enrolled at the high school, and employed three teachers.  On December 14, 1890 a fire completely destroyed the Central School. The loss was serious, as the building accommodated 700 students. Following the disaster, local lumber baron Charles Hackley (January 3, 1837 – January 10, 1905) offered to furnish money to build two new schools. One, a new high school located on Jefferson at Washington Avenue, opened in September 1893.  The second, the Hackley School, rose on the site of the original Central school.  In 1895, Hackley followed that pledge with money to build a Manual Training School, designed to provide training for pupils seeking education in the industrial arts.  Opened in 1897, it was one of the first in the nation.  For many years, an open house was held in June, allowing citizens to admire the work of the students in woodworking, drafting, foundry, printing and pattern-making.

In 1902, a gymnasium featuring a swimming pool, opened on the high school campus, and an adjoining tract was purchased for use as an athletic field.  The site, designed by athletic director and coach Robert Zuppke, debuted in 1907.

A new high school, built to the south of the old high school, was opened in September 1926. The old school was rechristened Central Junior High School. The closing of portions of two city streets created a Central Campus.

One of the first student projects of 1926 was a student-led bond drive to raise funds to build a stadium to the east of Hackley Field.  Opened in the fall of 1927, Hackley Stadium continues to serve the district.

On October 21, 1929, a bronze sculpture honoring Hackley was unveiled on the Muskegon High School campus.  Alma Mater by Lorado Taft features a central figure, Athena, the goddess of learning. She is holding the torch of knowledge and sheltering the spark of learning. Hackley's profile is carved in the stone beneath. Stone benches flank the sculpture. On the right side of the memorial is a relief of Mercury, the god of commerce, designed to symbolize Hackley's connections to industry.  To the left is carved the Good Samaritan, the symbol of charity, meant to represent Hackley's role as benefactor to the school district and the city he loved.

Muskegon High School's band program earned national recognition under the guidance of William Stewart, who arrived as a teacher in 1936. Stewart's bands were invited to perform several times at the Midwest Clinic in Chicago, and in 1957 the national publication First Chair of America featured the members of the Muskegon Band and dedicated the issue to them.

The school has published an annual since 1894.  Originally known as The Hyperion, it has been named Said and Done since the 1910s. The school newspaper is known as The Campus Keyhole.

The Hackley Manual Training School was torn down in 1962 as the expense to bring the building up to modern safety standards were deemed excessive.

In 1978, a two-story addition was added to the school.  Featuring the C. Leo Redmond/Harry E. Potter gymnasium and Frank DeYoe library, the facility also features a weight room, Olympic-sized swimming pool, athletic offices and classrooms.

The Native American symbols used as a logo and mascot were discontinued following the 2002-03 school year. They were replaced by a stylistic block M, with origins dating back to the early 1900s.

In 2009-10, Muskegon High School began offering students  IB Diploma Programme, a college preparatory course of study for highly motivated high school students.

Athletics
Muskegon High School is a member of the OK Green and the Michigan High School Athletic Association (MHSAA). The athletic teams are known as the Big Reds. The school colors are cardinal and white.  The following MHSAA sanctioned sports are offered:

Baseball (boys)
Basketball (girls and boys)
Boys state champions - 1927, 1937, 2014
Bowling (girls and boys)
Competitive cheer (girls)
Cross country (girls and boys)
Football (boys)
State champions - 1986, 1989, 2004, 2006, 2008, 2017
Soccer (girls and boys)
Softball (girls)
Track and field (girls and boys)
Volleyball (girls)
Wrestling (boys)

Notable alumni

Athletics
 Ronald Johnson - USC/NFL football
 Terrance Taylor - U of M/NFL football
 Earl Morrall - MSU/NFL football
 Ray Newman - MLB pitcher
 Bennie Oosterbaan - U of M football/Basketball, Mr Basketball Winner
 Kalil Pimpleton - NFL wide receiver
 Deyonta Davis- Basketball  
 DeShaun Thrower - Basketball

Business
 Roy Roberts - Vice president, General Motors
 Gerry Teifer - Former President and General manager of RCA Music Publishing

Politics
Elmer L. Andersen - Governor of Minnesota
Richard Mell - Chicago City Council

Arts and entertainment
 Jim Bakker - Televanglist
 Harry Morgan - Actor
 John Frederick Nims - Poet
 Bill Szymczyk - Music Producer
 Richard Versalle - New York Metropolitan Opera

References 

Public high schools in Michigan
Schools in Muskegon County, Michigan
Buildings and structures in Muskegon, Michigan
Educational institutions established in 1872
1872 establishments in Michigan